Vivian “Vivi” Andrea Herrera Mejía (born 6 May 1996) is a Guatemalan footballer who plays as a midfielder for Unifut Rosal and the Guatemala women's national team.

References

1996 births
Living people
Women's association football midfielders
Guatemalan women's footballers
Guatemala women's international footballers